Aleksandr Grigoryevich Loran (1849 – presumably 1911), also known as Alexander Laurant, Aleksandr Lovan, or Aleksandr Lavrentyev, was a Moldovan teacher and inventor of fire fighting foam and foam extinguishers.

He was born in 1849 in Chișinău (Russian: Кишинёв) in the Russian Empire, now the capital of Moldova. After graduating from the Saint Petersburg Polytechnical Institute, he continued his education in Paris, where he studied chemistry.

Returning to Russia, Loran became a teacher in a school in Baku, which was the main center of the Russian oil industry at that time. Impressed by the terrible and hardly extinguishable oil fires that he had seen there, Loran tried to find such a liquid substance that could deal effectively with the problem.  So he invented fire fighting foam, which was successfully tested in several experiments in 1902-1903. In 1904 Loran patented his invention, and developed the first foam extinguisher the same year.

Subsequently, he founded a company called Eurica, based in Saint Petersburg, and started to sell his fire extinguishers under that brand.

See also 
 List of Russian inventors

References 

1849 births
1911 deaths
Moldavian inventors
Russian inventors
Engineers from the Russian Empire
Chemists from the Russian Empire
People from Chișinău
Peter the Great St. Petersburg Polytechnic University alumni